Brookhaven/Oglethorpe (originally Brookhaven and signed Brookhaven/Oglethorpe Univ. on station signs) is a train station in Brookhaven, Georgia, on the Gold Line of the Metropolitan Atlanta Rapid Transit Authority (MARTA) rail system. An elevated station, it is located one mile south of Oglethorpe University. The station provides connecting bus service to North Druid Hills, Toco Hills, North DeKalb Mall, the Peachtree Boulevard business district, and the Georgia Department of Labor.

In the 2010s, the station was planned to become a "city center" for Brookhaven on the property composed of mixed use, office, retail, civic and public space. The plan was canceled in 2017.

Station layout

Parking
Brookhaven/Oglethorpe has 1,252 daily and long term parking spaces available for MARTA users, located in paved parking lots.

Development

MARTA and the City of Brookhaven planned to build a transit-oriented "city center" on the station's parking lot in 2014. The proposal entailed a development composed of mixed uses, offices, retailers, and civic and public space. The project was canceled in early 2017, after plans by Brookhaven's mayor to suspend their work on the project and delay rezoning and tax incentives for the property's development.

Landmarks and popular destinations
Oglethorpe University

Bus routes
The station is served by the following MARTA bus routes:
 Route 8 - North Druid Hills Road
 Route 25 - Peachtree Industrial Boulevard
 Route 47 - I-85 Access Road / Briarwood Road
 Route 110 - Peachtree Road / Buckhead

References

External links
MARTA station page
nycsubway.org Atlanta page
 Station from Google Maps Street View

Gold Line (MARTA)
Metropolitan Atlanta Rapid Transit Authority stations
Railway stations in the United States opened in 1984
Railway stations in DeKalb County, Georgia
Transportation in Brookhaven, Georgia
1984 establishments in Georgia (U.S. state)